Elias Tozer (21 November 1825 – 13 December 1873) was a Devon journalist, poet and collector of folk stories.

Life

Elias Tozer was born on 21 November 1825 in Exeter.
For many years he was a reporter for the Western Times, an Exeter paper.
Later he bought the newspaper Chambers' Exeter Journal. 
His paper was merged into the Devon Weekly Times, and Tozer became joint owner of this newspaper.
Elias Tozer died on 13 December 1873.

Work

Tozer wrote many articles on Devonshire country life, and delighted in reproducing dialect. 
For example, he wrote of a visit to the village of Drewsteignton when the bells were being rung, They be often ringing, sir,' observed an old man to me; and he continued: 'The ringers be vurry fond of the bells, and sometimes they ring vor vurry little. T'other day Varmer Dadd killed a peg, and gied the natlins to the poor of the parish. Darned if the ringers didden ring vor a whole hour, as they zed, to cillebrate the hayvent.
Tozer could write in a more serious vein. 
Thus he describes a ritual that until recently had been observed in the village of Buckland-in-the-Moor on Midsummer Day in which the youth of the village would sacrifice a sheep on the block of granite and sprinkle themselves with the blood.  He could not find what the significance of the ritual was,but says it was thought to have pre-Christian Celtic origins.

Tozer's Devonshire & Other Original Poems, originally published in 1873 under the nom-de-plume of "Tickler", was very popular.
Most of the poems had been published in the Devon Weekly Times or the Evening Express.
A dialect poem entitled "Satan's visit to North Lew as told by Ma Granfer" begins:

Some poems were in standard English, thus On Cawsand Beacon celebrates the famous Dartmoor hill as,

Publications

Notes

Sources

1825 births
1873 deaths
Writers from Exeter
English male poets